The Oxonian Review is a literary magazine produced by postgraduate students at the University of Oxford. Every fortnight during term time, an online edition is published featuring reviews and essays on current affairs and literature. It is the largest university-wide postgraduate-student publication at the University of Oxford.

History
The Oxonian Review was established in 2001 at Balliol College, Oxford, as the Oxonian Review of Books, as a termly print magazine featuring essays and reviews of recently published work in literature, politics, history, science, and the arts, written by postgraduate students of the University of Oxford.

In November 2008, the publication carried out a large recruitment drive in order to expand beyond Balliol College and reach a wider audience. It relaunched in January 2009 as a web-based magazine, publishing fortnightly during term time, and annually in print. It was also renamed The Oxonian Review in 2009. The magazine also now organises a series of events in Oxford, including speaker dinners, music evenings, film screenings, competitions, and writers' workshops.

See also

 Cherwell (newspaper)
 The Oxford Student

References

External links
 

2001 establishments in England
Annual magazines published in the United Kingdom
Balliol College, Oxford
Biweekly magazines published in the United Kingdom

Literary magazines published in the United Kingdom
Online magazines published in the United Kingdom
Student magazines published in the United Kingdom
Magazines established in 2001
Mass media in Oxford
Publications associated with the University of Oxford